The 2024 United Nations Biodiversity Conference (COP16) of the Parties to the UN Convention on Biological Diversity (CBD) is planned to be held in 2024 in Turkey. The monitoring framework agreed at the previous conference should allow the progress of the countries towards goals and targets in the Kunming-Montreal Global Biodiversity Framework since then to be evaluated.

See also 

 Biodiversity loss

 Environmental issues in Turkey

References 

Biodiversity
United Nations conferences on the environment
Convention on Biological Diversity
Events postponed due to the COVID-19 pandemic
Diplomatic conferences in Turkey
Turkey and the United Nations